Cheddar cheese (or simply cheddar) is a natural cheese that is relatively hard, off-white (or orange if colourings such as annatto are added), and sometimes sharp-tasting. Cheddar originates from the English village of Cheddar in Somerset.

Cheddar cheese is produced all over the world, and cheddar cheese has no protected designation of origin either in the United Kingdom or the European Union. In 2007, the protected designation of origin name "West Country Farmhouse Cheddar" was registered in the EU and (after Brexit) the UK, defined as cheddar produced from local milk within Somerset, Dorset, Devon and Cornwall and manufactured using traditional methods. Protected Geographical Indication (PGI) was registered for Orkney Scottish Island Cheddar in 2013 in the EU, which also applies under UK law. Globally, the style and quality of cheeses labelled as cheddar may vary greatly, with some processed cheeses being packaged as "cheddar". Furthermore, certain cheeses that are similar in taste and appearance to Red Leicester are sometimes marketed as "red cheddar".

Cheddar is the most popular cheese in the UK, accounting for 51% of the country's £1.9 billion annual cheese market.

History

Cheddar cheese originates from the village of Cheddar in Somerset, southwest England. Cheddar Gorge on the edge of the village contains a number of caves, which provided the ideal humidity and steady temperature for maturing the cheese. Cheddar traditionally had to be made within  of Wells Cathedral.

Nineteenth-century Somerset dairyman Joseph Harding was central to the modernisation and standardisation of cheddar. For his technical innovations, promotion of dairy hygiene, and volunteer dissemination of modern cheese-making techniques, Harding has been dubbed "the father of cheddar". Harding introduced new equipment to the process of cheese-making, including his "revolving breaker" for curd cutting; the revolving breaker saved much manual effort in the cheese-making process. The "Joseph Harding method" was the first modern system for cheddar production based upon scientific principles. Harding stated that cheddar cheese is "not made in the field, nor in the byre, nor even in the cow, it is made in the dairy". Together, Joseph Harding and his wife were behind the introduction of the cheese into Scotland and North America, while his sons Henry and William Harding were responsible for introducing cheddar cheese production to Australia and facilitating the establishment of the cheese industry in New Zealand, respectively.

During the Second World War and for nearly a decade thereafter, most of the milk in Britain was used to make a single kind of cheese nicknamed "government cheddar" as part of the war economy and rationing. As a result, almost all other cheese production in the country was wiped out. Before the First World War, more than 3,500 cheese producers were in Britain; fewer than 100 remained after the Second World War.

According to a United States Department of Agriculture researcher, cheddar is the world's most popular cheese and is the most studied type of cheese in scientific publications.

Process

During the manufacture of cheddar, the curds and whey are separated using rennet, an enzyme complex normally produced from the stomachs of newborn calves (in vegetarian or kosher cheeses, bacterial, yeast or mould-derived chymosin is used).

"Cheddaring" refers to an additional step in the production of cheddar cheese where, after heating, the curd is kneaded with salt, cut into cubes to drain the whey, and then stacked and turned. Strong, extra-mature cheddar, sometimes called vintage, needs to be matured for 15 months or more. The cheese is kept at a constant temperature, often requiring special facilities. As with other hard cheese varieties produced worldwide, caves provide an ideal environment for maturing cheese; still, today, some cheddar is matured in the caves at Wookey Hole and Cheddar Gorge. Additionally, some versions of cheddar are smoked.

Character

The ideal quality of the original Somerset cheddar was described by Joseph Harding in 1864 as "close and firm in texture, yet mellow in character or quality; it is rich with a tendency to melt in the mouth, the flavour full and fine, approaching to that of a hazelnut".

Cheddar made in the classical way tends to have a sharp, pungent flavour, often slightly earthy. The "sharpness" of cheddar is associated with the levels of bitter peptides in the cheese. This bitterness has been found to be significant to the overall perception of the aged cheddar flavour. The texture is firm, with farmhouse traditional cheddar being slightly crumbly; it should also, if mature, contain large cheese crystals consisting of calcium lactate – often precipitated when matured for times longer than six months.

Cheddar can be a deep to pale yellow (off-white) colour, or a yellow-orange colour when certain plant extracts are added, such as beet juice. One commonly used spice is annatto, extracted from seeds of the tropical achiote tree. Originally added to simulate the colour of high-quality milk from grass-fed Jersey and Guernsey cows, annatto may also impart a sweet, nutty flavour. The largest producer of cheddar cheese in the United States, Kraft, uses a combination of annatto and oleoresin paprika, an extract of the lipophilic (oily) portion of paprika.

Cheddar was sometimes (and still can be found) packaged in black wax, but was more commonly packaged in larded cloth, which was impermeable to contaminants, but still allowed the cheese to "breathe".

Original-cheddar designation 
The Slow Food Movement has created a cheddar presidium, arguing that only three cheeses should be called "original cheddar". Their specifications, which go further than the "West Country Farmhouse Cheddar" PDO, require that cheddar be made in Somerset and with traditional methods, such as using raw milk, traditional animal rennet, and a cloth wrapping.

International production
The "cheddar cheese" name is used internationally; its name does not have a protected designation of origin, but the use of the name "West Country Farmhouse Cheddar" does. In addition to the United Kingdom, cheddar is also made in Australia, Argentina, Belgium, Canada, Germany, Ireland, the Netherlands, New Zealand, South Africa, Sweden, Finland, Uruguay and the United States. Cheddars can be either industrial or artisan cheeses. The flavour, colour, and quality of industrial cheese varies significantly, and food packaging will usually indicate a strength, such as mild, medium, strong, tasty, sharp, extra sharp, mature, old, or vintage; this may indicate the maturation period, or food additives used to enhance the flavour. Artisan varieties develop strong and diverse flavours over time.

Australia
Cheddar is so commonly found that the name is rarely used: instead, cheddar is sold by strength alone as e.g. "mild", "tasty" or "sharp".

Canada
Following a wheat midge outbreak in Canada in the mid-19th century, farmers in Ontario began to convert to dairy farming in large numbers, and cheddar cheese became their main exportable product, even being exported to England. By the turn of the 20th century, 1,242 cheddar factories were in Ontario, and cheddar had become Canada's second-largest export after timber. Cheddar exports totalled  in 1904, but by 2012, Canada was a net importer of cheese. James L. Kraft grew up on a dairy farm in Ontario, before moving to Chicago. According to the writer Sarah Champman, "Although we cannot wholly lay the decline of cheese craft in Canada at the feet of James Lewis Kraft, it did correspond with the rise of Kraft’s processed cheese empire." Most Canadian cheddar is produced in the provinces of Québec (40.8%) and Ontario (36%), though other provinces produce some and some smaller artisanal producers exist. The annual production is 120,000 tons. It is aged a minimum of three months, but much of it is held for much longer, up to 10 years.

Canadian cheddar cheese soup is a featured dish at the Canada pavilion at Epcot, in Walt Disney World.

Percentage of milk fat must be labelled by the words milk fat or abbreviations B.F. or M.F.

New Zealand
Most of the cheddar produced in New Zealand is factory-made, although some are handmade by artisan cheesemakers. Factory-made cheddar is generally sold relatively young within New Zealand, but the Anchor dairy company ships New Zealand cheddars to the UK, where the blocks mature for another year or so.

United Kingdom

Only one producer of the cheese is now based in the village of Cheddar, the Cheddar Gorge Cheese Co. The name "cheddar" is not protected under European Union or UK law, though the name "West Country Farmhouse Cheddar" has an EU and (following Brexit) a UK protected designation of origin (PDO) registration, and may only be produced in Somerset, Devon, Dorset and Cornwall, using milk sourced from those counties. Cheddar is usually sold as mild, medium, mature, extra mature or vintage. Cheddar produced in Orkney is registered as an EU protected geographical indication under the name "Orkney Scottish Island Cheddar". This protection highlights the use of traditional methods, passed down through generations since 1946 and its uniqueness in comparison to other cheddar cheeses. "West Country Farmhouse Cheddar" is protected outside the UK and the EU as a Geographical Indication also in China, Georgia, Iceland, Japan, Moldova, Montenegro, Norway, Serbia, Switzerland and Ukraine.

Furthermore, a Protected Geographical Indication (PGI) was registered for Orkney Scottish Island Cheddar in 2013 in the EU, which also applies under UK law. It is protected as a geographical indication in Iceland, Montenegro, Norway and Serbia.

United States 

The state of Wisconsin produces the most cheddar cheese in the United States; other centers of production include California, Idaho, New York, Vermont, Oregon, Texas, and Oklahoma. It is sold in several varieties, namely mild, medium, sharp, extra sharp, New York style, white, and Vermont. New York-style cheddar is particularly sharp/acidic, but tends to be somewhat softer than the milder-tasting varieties. Cheddar that does not contain annatto is frequently labelled "white cheddar" or "Vermont cheddar" (regardless of whether it was actually produced there). Vermont's three creameries produce cheddar cheeses—Cabot Creamery, which produces the 16-month-old "Private Stock Cheddar"; the Grafton Village Cheese Company; and Shelburne Farms.

Some processed cheeses or "cheese foods" are called "cheddar flavoured". Examples include Easy Cheese, a cheese-food packaged in a pressurised spray can; also, as packs of square, sliced, individually-wrapped "process cheese", which is sometimes also pasteurised.

Cheddar is one of several products used by the United States Department of Agriculture to track the status of America's overall dairy industry; reports are issued weekly detailing prices and production quantities.

Records
U.S. President Andrew Jackson once held an open house party at the White House at which he served a  block of cheddar. The White House is said to have smelled of cheese for weeks.

It was planned to be exhibited at the Canadian display, but the mammoth cheese fell through the floor and was placed on a reinforced concrete floor in the Agricultural Building. It received the most journalistic attention at the fair and was awarded the bronze medal. A cheese this size would use the equivalent of the daily milk production of 16,000 cows.

Oregon members of the Federation of American Cheese-makers created the largest cheddar in 1989.

See also

 List of cheeses
 Colby, Red Leicester – cheeses similar to cheddar which also contain annatto for a sweet and nutty flavor and an orange color
 Wedginald – a round of cheddar made famous when its maturation was broadcast on the Internet

References

External links
 Icons of England – Cheddar Cheese (non-commercial site commissioned by UK Government Department for Culture, Media and Sport)

British products with protected designation of origin
Cheeses with designation of origin protected in the European Union
Cow's-milk cheeses
English cheeses
English inventions
Somerset cuisine